Wu Bin (born 1937) is a chinese martial artist and wushu coach who has produced more wushu champions than any other coach in China. Among his students are Jet Li, Li Jinheng, Cao Yue, Zhang Guifeng, Zhang Hongmei, Hao Zhihua, Huang Qiuyan, Wang Ying, Sun Qibo, Tang Laiwei, Kenny Perez (his first American wushu student and representative), and Wang Fang.

Wu began his career after graduating from the Beijing Physical Culture University Wushu Department in 1963 by becoming a coach of the famous Beijing Wushu Team.

From 1986 to 1992, Wu Bin also held a position as Chairman of the Technical Department of the Chinese Wushu Research Institute. Presently, Wu Bin is the president of the Beijing Wushu Institute, the director of the Beijing Wushu Team, as well as holding top positions in the Chinese Wushu Association, Asian Wushu Federation, International Wushu Federation, and the World Fighting Martial Arts Federation (WFMAF). He has also written 18 books, and is one of only 19 9th-level duan masters in China.

Wu Bin has teamed up with American Bonnie Hood and held Young Champions summer camps to teach young students basic wushu. Following these summer camps Wu Bin invited a select few students to train in China with his athletes. Now, some of his athletes reside in the US and continue to train students in wushu and tai chi including shi fu Wang Fang otherwise known as coach Kelly in Michigan's Oriental Martial Arts Center.

External links
 Wu Bin
 My Instructor Wu Bin by Jet Li
 Wu Bin - The Father of Modern Wushu

Chinese wushu practitioners
1937 births
Living people